The 1947 Memphis State Tigers football team represented Memphis State College (now known as the University of Memphis) as an independent during the 1947 college football season. In its first season under head coach Ralph Hatley, the team compiled a 6–2–1 record and outscored opponents by a total of 238 to 60. Fred Medling was the team captain. The team played its home games at Crump Stadium in Memphis, Tennessee.

Schedule

References

Memphis State
Memphis Tigers football seasons
Memphis State Tigers football